The FIBA U18 Women's European Championship is a basketball competition inaugurated in 1965. The current champions are Lithuania.

Division A

Results

Medal table
 Defunct states in italics

Participation details

Division B

Results

* Since 2012, the 3rd team in Division B is also promoted to Division A for the next tournament.

Performances by nation

Participation details

Division C

Results

Performances by nation

See also 
 EuroBasket Women
 FIBA U20 Women's European Championship
 FIBA U16 Women's European Championship

References

 Archive FIBA

External links
 Official site

 
Recurring sporting events established in 1965
Women's basketball competitions in Europe between national teams
Europe